Uçan ağıl is an archaeological site north of Sirab village in Babək district in Azerbaijan.

Description
Uçan ağıl was investigated through archaeological excavations from 2015 to 2017 by an international archaeological expedition from Azerbaijan and France led by Vali Baxşəliyev and Catherine Marro. The surface materials are painted bowls and straw ceramics. Among the finds are ceramic pieces from the Kura–Araxes culture. Among the results, a number of tools similar to stone axes are known from Duzdağ. This settlement is important in terms of spreading and learning the Dalma culture in Azerbaijan and South Caucasus.

References

Tells (archaeology)
Prehistoric sites in Azerbaijan
Archaeological sites in Azerbaijan
Ancient pottery
Chalcolithic sites of Asia